Cyril Winnington Onslow (17 December 1815 – 24 July 1866) was an English cricketer who played for a side representing the county of Kent in 1841, the year before the formation of the first Kent County Cricket Club.

Onslow was the son of Arthur Onslow, a clergyman, and his wife Elizabeth and was born at Newington in Surrey in 1815. He played club cricket for Penshurst and Tunbridge Wells Cricket Clubs and for West Kent, generally as an opening batsman. In 1841 he made his only first-class cricket appearance, playing for a Kent XI against an England side at Bromley. He scored four runs in the only innings Kent batted in and was not out.

Onslow worked in the police force, initially as a constable at Sheerness Dockyard, rising to the rank of Superintendent at Tunbridge Wells. He married Mary Hewlett at Barnstaple in Devon in 1848; the couple had two daughter's before Mary's death in 1855. Onslow died at Tunbridge Wells in 1866 aged 50.

References

External links

1815 births
1866 deaths
English cricketers
Kent cricketers